Avon High School is the name of:

Avon High School (Connecticut), Avon, Connecticut
Avon High School (Illinois), Avon, Illinois
Avon High School (Indiana), Avon, Indiana
Avon High School (Massachusetts), Avon, Massachusetts
Avon High School (New York), Avon, New York
Avon High School (Ohio), Avon, Ohio
Avon High School (South Dakota), Avon, South Dakota
Avon Lake High School, Avon Lake, Ohio
Avon Park High School, Avon Park, Florida
Avon Grove High School, West Grove, Pennsylvania